Aonach Beag is a  mountain in the Highlands of Scotland in the remote area between Loch Ericht and Loch Laggan located about  northwest of Ben Alder. In Gaelic, Aonach Beag means "little ridge" despite it being a Munro.

The mountain is one of a range of hills running between Loch Ossian and Loch Pattack and is itself at the convergence of three ridges. Its neighbouring peak to the west is Beinn Eibhinn which extends over a larger area although at  it is slightly less high. Between these two peaks is Lochan a'Chàrra Mhòir at the head of Choire a'Chàrra Mhòir. The shortest route of ascent starts from Corrour railway station and passes Loch Ossian youth hostal before going beside the southern shore of Loch Ossian to pass Corrour Lodge and then go up Bealach Dubh along Uisge Labhair. At one time the peak was often climbed after staying at Culra bothy but the bothy has since been closed. All routes involve a considerable walk-in.

The mountain lies within the Ben Alder and Aonach Beag Special Area of Conservation as an upland area of acidic scree with Alpine and subalpine calcareous grasslands. The area is very varied ecologically – the three-leaved rush, hare's-foot sedge and scorched alpine sedge are to be found near the summit. On account of the lengthy snow cover the area is exceptional for its bryophytes.

See also 
 Ben Nevis
 List of Munro mountains
 Mountains and hills of Scotland

References

Citations

Works cited

Munros
Mountains and hills of the Central Highlands
Mountains and hills of Highland (council area)
One-thousanders of Scotland